Michael Glanzberg is an American analytic philosopher specializing in philosophy of language and philosophical logic who is currently affiliated with Rutgers University. He received his PhD in philosophy from Harvard University, where Charles Parsons and Warren Goldfarb supervised his dissertation. Glanzberg has previously held faculty positions at Northwestern University, University of California, Davis, University of Toronto, and MIT. Often working at the intersection of logic and the philosophy of language, Glanzberg is recognized for his work on quantification, paradox, semantics, theories of truth, and the role of context in various linguistic settings. He frequently collaborates with Jc Beall.

See also
 Absolute generality
 Contextualism

References

Rutgers University faculty
Northwestern University faculty
University of California, Davis faculty
Academic staff of the University of Toronto
MIT School of Humanities, Arts, and Social Sciences faculty
Harvard Graduate School of Arts and Sciences alumni
Year of birth missing (living people)
Living people